Willy Saeren (8 April 1924 – 13 August 2002) was a Belgian footballer. He played in two matches for the Belgium national football team in 1952.

References

External links
 

1924 births
2002 deaths
Belgian footballers
Belgium international footballers
Place of birth missing
Association football defenders